Automatic Vaudeville Studios (AVS) is an underground movie collective based out of Montreal. Founded in 1998 and modeled after the golden age of Hollywood's movie studios, AVS has churned out close to 100 shorts using local artists, musicians, actors and other unpaid talent to bring their no-budget genre inspired entertainments to life.

Some of Automatic Vaudeville's notable productions include The Recommendations, a comedy about jealousy and revenge in the literary demi-monde, Spanked: The Ron Friendly Story, about the tumultuous life and times of a fictional performance artist, Young Cons, and the ongoing provocative art project / film series known as the Schandcycle, which features improvised music performed by Montreal music collective Schandkollektief.

A selection of Automatic Vaudeville's work can be found on their limited-run DVD releases, Your Hi-Class DVD, Vol. 1 and Your Hi-Class DVD, Vol. 2.

Press coverage 

 NOW cover story on Automatic Vaudeville from November 25, 2004 
 Review of The Recommendations from Toronto's Eye Weekly.

External links 

Film production companies of Canada
Culture of Montreal
Film collectives
Cinema of Quebec
Organizations based in Montreal
Arts organizations established in 1998
Quebec Anglophone culture in Montreal